Dennis McCarthy (born July 3, 1945) is an American composer of television and film scores. His soundtrack credits include several entries in the Star Trek franchise, including underscores for The Next Generation, Deep Space Nine, Voyager, Enterprise, and the 1994 feature film Star Trek Generations. His other television credits include Dynasty, V, MacGyver, Sliders, Dawson's Creek, and Project Greenlight. He also produced the album Ol' Yellow Eyes Is Back by Brent Spiner also from Star Trek, and composed music for stage productions.

McCarthy has won 18 ASCAP awards and a Primetime Emmy Award for his theme on Deep Space Nine, in addition to nine Emmy nominations for his various Star Trek-related work. He also shares one Emmy for his music direction for the 63rd Academy Awards.

Filmography

Feature films

Television

Other media

References

External links
 

1945 births
American film score composers
American television composers
Emmy Award winners
Living people
American male film score composers
Male television composers